Kewsong Lee (born August 12, 1965) is a Korean-American businessman who is the former chief executive officer (CEO) of private equity firm The Carlyle Group.

Early life and education 
Lee was born in Albany, New York on August 12, 1965. His father, Lee Hak-jong, was a professor at Yonsei University.

Due to his father's role as a college professor and involvement in the United Nations, Lee would spend his early years in South Korea and Singapore. He then attended boarding school at Choate Rosemary Hall in Wallingford, Connecticut where he graduated in 1982.

Lee attended Harvard College where he received an A.B. in Applied Mathematics in Economics, graduating in 1986. He would later return to Harvard where he received his MBA from Harvard Business School in 1990.

Career 
Lee's first job after graduation from Harvard was at consulting firm, McKinsey & Company. He spent two years there before leaving in 1988 to attend Harvard Business School.

Lee did a summer internship at Goldman Sachs in 1989 but ultimately decided to return to McKinsey & Company in 1990 after graduating from Harvard Business School.

In 1992, Lee joined private equity firm, Warburg Pincus. He would spend 21 years at the firm where he became a Partner as well as a member of the Executive Management Group. While at Warburg, Lee was involved in transactions that included companies such as Neiman Marcus, Aramark, TransDigm and MBIA.

From 2009 to 2017, Lee was a lead director at Arch Capital Group as well as a board member for other firms such as Transdigm and Aramark.

The Carlyle Group 
In 2013, Lee joined The Carlyle Group as deputy chief investment officer for corporate private equity. In 2016, Lee also assumed the role of leading the global credit unit.

In October 2017, the firm announced that its founders would remain executive chairmen on the board of directors but would step down as the day-to-day leaders of the firm. They named Lee and Glenn Youngkin to succeed them as co-chief executive officers, effective January 1, 2018. As co-chief executive officers, Lee oversaw the firm's corporate private equity and global credit businesses and Youngkin oversaw Carlyle's real estate, energy, infrastructure businesses, and investment solutions businesses. Lee and Youngkin also joined the firm's board of directors when they became co-chief executive officers.

During Lee and Youngkin's tenure as co-chief executive officers, they oversaw the firm's transition from a publicly traded partnership into a corporation.

There was an alleged power struggle between Lee and Youngkin during their time together at Carlyle where Lee eventually won out. This was largely due to Lee  being given control of the corporate private equity and global credit units at the onset, which were bigger and more profitable than the others.

In July 2020, Youngkin stepped down from his role at Carlyle, making Lee the sole chief executive officer of the firm.

On August 8, 2022 Lee stepped down from his role as CEO due to a dispute in negotiations regarding his contract renewal. Lee proposed a $300 million pay package. Co-founder William E. Conway Jr. was announced to act as interim leader of the Carlyle Group while the firm searched for a new CEO.

Personal life 
Lee is married to Zita Ezpeleta and they have two children. Lee and Ezpeleta met in Lowell House at Harvard College when they were undergraduates. Ezpeleta is an attorney who previously practiced at Sidley Austin.

References

External links 
Profile at The Carlyle Group

1965 births
Living people
20th-century businesspeople
21st-century businesspeople
American chief executives of financial services companies
Businesspeople from Albany, New York
Harvard College alumni
Harvard Business School alumni
McKinsey & Company people
Warburg Pincus people
The Carlyle Group people
American people of South Korean descent
Choate Rosemary Hall alumni